Kim Geu-rim (born March 1, 1987), professionally known as Kim Greem, is a South Korean singer.

Discography

Singles

Soundtrack appearances

Notes

References 

1987 births
Living people
K-pop singers
South Korean women pop singers
South Korean rhythm and blues singers
South Korean singer-songwriters
South Korean female idols
Superstar K participants
21st-century South Korean singers
21st-century South Korean women singers
South Korean women singer-songwriters